Rajasimha II may refer to:

 Rajasinha II of Kandy
 Maravarman Rajasimha II